Sphaerotheca castagnei is a species of ascomycete fungus in the family Erysiphaceae. A plant pathogen, it causes a form of powdery mildew.

Description
The mycelium is abundant and persistent or sometimes inconspicuous, and occurs on either side or both sides of the infected leaves. The perithecia are abundant, scattered or somewhat aggregated, small, usually about 75 µm long, but varying from 60 to 100 µm. The texture is soft, surface uneven, reticulations very large and irregular, 20–30 µm. The appendages are long, stout, usually colored throughout; but sometimes colorless, flexuous, somewhat uneven in width, and more or less interwoven with the mycelium. The ascus is rather small, elliptical or suborbicular in shape.

Development of the perithecium
The oogonium and antheridium, which are formed where two neighboring hyphae approach, each contain a single nucleus. The cell wall between these organs is dissolved at the time of fertilization and the male and female nuclei unite, and a fresh wall is laid down between the two organs. Now the wall of the future perithecium beings to form by the development of a number of upright hyphal branches around the oogonium, forming a pseudo-parenchymatous tissue, while the other branches later absorbed grow into the interior of the developing perithecium, while the outer cell walls become flattened and darker in color. Like other species in Sphaerotheca, S. castagnei contains only a single ascus. The cell in which the egg nucleus develops and is fertilized (the carpogonium) elongates, divides and a curved row of 5 or 6 cells is formed. The penultimate cell of this row contains two large nuclei; while the other cells of the row have one nucleus each. The young ascus develops from this penultimate cell in which the two nuclei fuse following a rapid increase in the size of the ascus; which presses against the inner wall cells of the perithecium and absorbs them. The nucleus of the ascus finally divides three times, producing the nuclei of the eight ascospores; which subsequently are formed by free cell formation. From the half-grown perithecium there arise hyphae which grow out as the appendages. These appendages serve to attach the perithecia to plants.

Spore discharge
Spore discharge in S. castagnei involves the rupture of the cleistothecium; and the escape of the spores from the ascus. This is accomplished by the appearance of a vertical slit in the perithecium, from which the ascus protrudes; swelling to several times the diameter of the perithecium. The walls of the ascus become rigid, the ascospores collect at the apex, eventually being discharged forcibly through the slit. Sometimes an ascus slips out of the perithecium, bursting open to discharge the spores.

References

Leotiomycetes
Fungi described in 1851
Fungal plant pathogens and diseases